Systems thinking is a way of making sense of the complexity of the world by looking at it in terms of wholes and relationships rather than by splitting it down into its parts. It has been used as a way of exploring and developing effective action in complex contexts, enabling systems change. Systems thinking draws on and contributes to systems theory and the system sciences.

History

Frameworks and methodologies
Frameworks and methodologies for systems thinking include:
 Critical systems heuristics
 Critical systems thinking
 Soft systems methodology
 Systemic design
 System dynamics
 Viable system model

See also
 Management cybernetics
 Operational research

References

 
Cybernetics
Systems science
Systems theory